Falard may refer to:
 Falard District
 Falard Rural District